Dena Schlosser ( Leitner, born 1969) is an American woman from Plano, Texas who, on November 22, 2004, used a knife to amputate the arms of her eleven-month-old daughter, Margaret, who died as a result. Plano police responded to a 9-1-1 call made by concerned workers at a local daycare center who had spoken to her earlier that day. The operator testified that she confessed to her and that the gospel song "He Touched Me" played in the background. When police arrived they saw her calmly sitting down, covered in blood, holding the knife, and singing Christian hymns.

Hours after her arrest, police heard her repeatedly chanting, "Thank you, Jesus. Thank you, Lord."

Early years 
At the age of eight, Dena Leitner was diagnosed with hydrocephalus. She had eight surgeries to implant shunts into her brain, heart and abdomen before she was 13 years old. She graduated from Marist College in Poughkeepsie, New York, with a bachelor's degree in psychology.

She met her husband, John Schlosser, when they were both students at Marist. Eventually they moved to Texas.

Margaret's death 
The day after Margaret was born, Schlosser attempted suicide, was hospitalized in a psychiatric ward, and was diagnosed with bipolar disorder with psychotic features. She had been investigated earlier that year by the Texas Child Protective Services (CPS) after she was hospitalized for a psychotic episode. CPS ordered that she could not be alone with her children. Her sister-in-law came to live with them until CPS lifted the order. Schlosser came to believe that Margaret was destined to marry Doyle Davidson, a veterinarian who had become their pastor. The day before she attacked Margaret, Schlosser told her husband that she wanted to give her to Davidson. Later that day, according to a confidential CPS report, he spanked her with a wooden spoon in front of their children. She fatally injured Margaret by severing her arms with a knife, while her other two daughters were not physically harmed.

Psychologist David Self testified that Schlosser told him about a disturbing news story she had seen. The news story concerned a boy who was mauled by a lion and she interpreted it as a sign of the coming apocalypse. She said that she heard God commanding her to remove Margaret's arms and then her own. The attack was later described as "religious frenzy". Self determined that she suffered from postpartum psychosis.  She was found not guilty by reason of insanity and was committed to the North Texas State Hospital and ordered to go
there until she is deemed to no longer be a threat to herself or others. There, she was a roommate of Andrea Yates, a Texas woman who had drowned her five children in a bathtub.

During the trial, much attention was drawn to Schlosser and her husband attending Water of Life Church, a charismatic church pastored by Davidson. She had been taking antipsychotic drugs for several years prior to Margaret's death. Davidson thought that mental illness was demonic and this belief partly led Schlosser's husband to not buy her medication regularly. Under oath, Davidson testified that in his view, all mental illness is demonic at bottom. Due to viewer outcry after the trial, Davidson's television ministry was canceled everywhere outside the Metroplex.

After Schlosser's arrest, her children were taken by CPS and kept in foster care. CPS said they would only allow him to regain custody of them under the condition that his sister live with the family, and he was required to complete psychotherapy and parenting classes. He received full custody of his daughters and raised them as a single father. He subsequently filed for divorce. As part of the divorce settlement, Schlosser was prohibited from ever having contact with him or their daughters again.

On November 6, 2008, it was announced that Schlosser would shortly be released into outpatient care. The order required her to see a psychiatrist once a week, take medication, be on physician-approved birth control, and not have any unsupervised contact with children.

In April 2010, it was reported that Schlosser was recommitted after firefighters from Richardson saw her walking down the street at 2:00 AM. Her attorney, David Haynes, said that he felt the judge made the correct decision.

Schlosser was later released to outpatient status. She stayed out of the public eye until 2012, when WFAA-TV in Dallas reported that she was working under her maiden name, Leitner, at a Walmart in Terrell. Within hours, they fired her.

As of December 2020, Dena Schlosser was ordered to remain committed to a state hospital.

In the media 
Schlosser was briefly seen in the 2005 documentary The God Who Wasn't There, which is critical of Christianity.

There is also a segment about Schlosser in an August 23, 2013, episode of Deadly Women called "Evil Guardians".

See also 
 Murder of Zachary Turner
 Filicide in Texas:
 John Battaglia
 Deanna Laney murders
 Darlie Routier
 Andrea Yates
 Yaser Abdel Said

References 

1969 births
2004 in Texas
American Christians
Filicides in Texas
Incidents of violence against girls
Infanticide
Living people
Marist College alumni
People acquitted by reason of insanity
People from Texas
People with bipolar disorder
People with hydrocephalus
Plano, Texas